HCTU is an aminium coupling reagent used in peptide synthesis. It is analogous to HBTU. The HOBt moiety has a chlorine in the 6 position which improves reaction rates and the synthesis of difficult couplings

References 

Peptide coupling reagents
Hexafluorophosphates